Bean is a word processor for Mac OS X. Originally free and open source software Bean became closed source at version 3. However, the Bean executable is still distributed free of charge. According to its author, James Hoover, Bean is not meant to replace Microsoft Word, but to be a lean word processor that is beautiful and user friendly. Many of Bean's operations are carried out by the underlying Cocoa framework of Mac OS X. The name Bean is a play on Cocoa and Java, two popular programming frameworks.

After the release of Bean 3.2.2 in November 2012, Hoover announced that "active development of Bean will cease. Bean will remain available for download at the bean-osx.com website. It may even be updated as necessary to keep the app running on future versions of OS X. Also, I'll try to continue technical support at the usual email address." Since this announcement, Hoover has provided further updates and fixes for Bean, reaching version number 3.4.7 by October 2022.

Features
The design of Bean was heavily influenced by Marten Van De Kraats' article "Lean Word Processor Specifics". It is especially suitable for note taking or writing short articles because the program is highly responsive and starts almost instantly, while full-featured office suites take a much longer time to load. While Bean is not designed to compete with programs like LibreOffice Writer, OpenOffice.org Writer, or Microsoft Word, its feature set is complete enough to cover the needs of many users. Starting with version 3, Bean has a completely new user interface with an emphasis on simplicity.

Bean has the following features:
 A 'Live Word' count
 A 'Get Info' panel for 'In-Depth' statistics
 A zoom-slider to easily change the view scale
 An Inspector panel with many sliders
 Date-stamped backups
 Autosaving
 A page layout mode
 An alternate colors option (e.g., white text on blue)
 Selection of text by Text Style, Paragraph Style, Color, etc.
 A floating windows option (like Stickies has)
 Dictionary, word completion, etc.

As of version 3:
 Tabbed editing
 Ability to resize the width of the draft edit view within its window

It also includes full-screen mode, which only displays the text.

The following features are deliberately missing: footnotes, pre-defined text styles, floating graphics (but it does support in-line graphics).

File formats 
Bean natively reads and writes these file formats:
 .rtf format (rich text)
 .rtfd format (Rich Text Format Directory, rich text with graphics)
 .bean format (identical to .rtfd)
 .txt format (Unicode and legacy)
 .html format (as source code)
 .webarchive format (Apple's web archive format)

Bean imports and exports these formats:
 .doc format (MS Word '97, minus images, margins, and page size)
 .docx format (Office Open XML, minus images and some formatting)
 .odt format (OpenDocument, minus images, margins, and page size)
 .xml format (Microsoft Word 2003 XML, minus images)

Bean can export all of the above formats to these formats:
 .html (web page format, minus images)
 .pdf
 .doc compatible (with images intact)
 .rtf (Rich Text Format, with images intact)

See also

List of word processors
Comparison of word processors
Office Open XML software
OpenDocument software

References

External links

2007 review at Low End Mac
2008 review at Macworld
2009 interview with James Hoover, creator of Bean

MacOS word processors
MacOS-only software
Word processors